Macroglossum micacea is a moth of the  family Sphingidae. It is known from the Solomon Islands, the D'Entrecasteaux Islands, Papua New Guinea and Queensland.

Subspecies
Macroglossum micacea micacea
Macroglossum micacea albibase Rothschild, 1905 (Papua New Guinea, Solomon Islands, D'Entrecasteaux Islands)

References

Macroglossum
Moths described in 1856